Coleophora eltonica is a moth of the family Coleophoridae. It is found in the lower Volga area in southern Russia.

The larvae feed on Artemisia species.

References

eltonica
Moths described in 2005
Moths of Europe